Kama, also known as Kamadeva and Manmatha, is the Hindu god of erotic love, desire and pleasure, often portrayed alongside his consort and female counterpart, Rati. He is depicted as a handsome young man decked with ornaments and flowers, armed with a bow of sugarcane and shooting arrows of flowers.

The Atharva Veda regards Kamadeva as the wielder of the creative power of the universe, also describing him to have been "born at first, him neither the gods nor the fathers ever equalled". Mentioned as a manasputra (mind-born son) of the creator god Brahma in the Puranas, Kamadeva's most popular legend is his story of incineration by Shiva's third eye while the latter was meditating, later embodied on earth as the eldest son of Krishna and his chief consort Rukmini, Pradyumna.

Etymology and other names
The name Kama-deva can be translated as 'god of love'. Deva means heavenly or divine, and refers to a deity in Hinduism. Kama means "desire" or "longing", especially as in sensual or sexual love. The name is used in Rig Veda (RV 9, 113. 11). Kamadeva is a name of Vishnu in Vishnu Purana and Bhagavata Purana (SB 5.18.15), and also Krishna as well as Shiva. Kama is also a name used for Agni (Atharva Veda 6.36.3).

Other names prominently used in reference to Kamadeva are:

Iconography
Kāmadeva is represented as a young, handsome man who wields a bow and arrows. His bow is made of sugarcane, and his arrows are decorated with five kinds of fragrant flowers. The five flowers are white lotus, Ashoka tree flowers, Mango tree flowers,  Jasmine flowers and blue lotus flowers. The names of these flowers in Sanskrit in order are Aravinda, Ashoka, Choota, Navamallika, and Neelotpala. A terracotta murti of Kamadeva of great antiquity is housed in the Mathura Museum, UP, India.

Some of the attributes of Kamadeva are: his companions are a cuckoo, a parrot, humming bees, the season of spring, and the gentle breeze. All these are symbols of spring season, when his festival is celebrated as Holi, Holika or Vasanta.

Textual sources
Images and stories about Hindu god Kamadeva are traced to the verses of the Rig Veda and Atharva Veda, although he is better known from the stories of the Puranas.

Kamadeva is also mentioned in the 12th-century Javanese poem Smaradahana, a rendering of the myth of Kamadeva's burning by Shiva and fall from heaven to earth. Kama and his consort Rati are referenced as Kamajaya and Kamarati in Kakawin poetry and later Wayang narratives.

Legends

Birth

The story of the birth of Kamadeva has several variants in different Hindu scriptures.

In the Taittiriya Brahmana and the epic Mahabharata, he is mentioned as a son of Dharma, the god of righteousness and a prajapati (agent of creation). His mother is mentioned to be Dharma's wife Shraddha in Taittiriya Brahmana, while the appendix of the Mahabharata, Harivamsa, states his mother to be Lakshmi, another wife of Dharma.

According to Puranic scriptures including the Shiva Purana, the Kalika Purana, the Brahma Vaivarta Purana and the Matsya Purana, Kama is one of the mind-born sons of the creator god Brahma. In the most common narrative, after Brahma creates all the prajapatis (agents of creations) and a maiden named Sandhya, an extremely handsome and youthful man emerges from his mind and enquires Brahma about the purpose of his birth. Brahma names him Kama and orders him to spread love in the world by shooting his flower-arrows. Kama decides to first use his arrows against Brahma and shoots him with his floral arrows. He becomes attracted to Sandhya and desires for her. The prajapati Dharma becomes worried by this and calls the god Shiva, who watches them and laughs at both Brahma and Kama. Brahma regains consciousness and curses Kama to be burnt to ashes by Shiva in the future. However, on Kama's pleading, Brahma assures him that he would be reborn. A later version of the myth is found in the Skanda Purana, according to which, Brahma creates Kama from his mind to ignite passion in the prajapatis (agents of creation) after they refused to procreate.

In some traditions, Kama is considered a son of the goddess of wealth Lakshmi and the preserver god Vishnu due to his birth as Pradyumna to Rukmini and Krishna, the incarnations of Lakshmi and Vishnu respectively. According to Matsya Purana, Visnu-Krishna and Kamadeva have a historical relationship.

Family and assistants
Both the epics and the Puranas attest the goddess Rati as the consort and chief assistant of Kamadeva. She is his female counterpart representing sensual pleasure. According to Kalika Purana and Shiva Purana, she emerged from a sweat drop of prajapati Daksha who was assigned by Brahma to present Kamadeva a wife. The Shiva Purana also mentions that Kama himself was pierced by his love-arrows when he saw Rati. The Brahmavaivarta Purana gives Rati another origin, according to which Sandhya died after Brahma desired for her but was revived as Rati by Vishnu who presented her to Kama. Priti ("affection") is mentioned as Kamadeva's second spouse in the Skanda Purana, while in other texts, 'Priti' is just an epithet of Rati.

In the most scriptures, Kama and Rati have two children, Harsha ("Joy") and Yashas ("Grace"). However, the Vishnu Purana mentions that they only has one son – Harsha.

Besides Rati, Kama's main assistant is Vasanta, the god of spring season, who was created by Brahma. Kama is served by a group of violent ganas known as the Maras.Kama also leads the celestial nymphs, the apsaras, and they are often sent by Indra—the king of heaven—to disturb the penance of sages to prevent them from achieving divine powers.

Incineration by Shiva

One of the principal myths regarding Kama is that of his incineration by Shiva, the Madana-bhasma (Kama Dahana). It occurs in its most developed form in the Matsya Purana (verses 227–255) but is also repeated with variants in the Shaiva Purana and
other Puranas.

In the narrative, Indra and the gods are suffering at the hands of the demon Tarakasura who cannot be defeated except by Shiva's son. Brahma advises that Parvati should do sacred pooja with lord Shiva, since their offspring would be able to defeat Taraka. Indra assigns Kamadeva to break Shiva's meditation. To create a congenial atmosphere, Kamadeva (Madana) creates an untimely spring (akāla-vasanta). He evades Shiva's guard, Nandin, by taking the form of the fragrant southern breeze, and enters Shiva's abode.

After he awakens Shiva with a flower arrow, Shiva, furious, opens his third eye, which incinerates Madana instantaneously and he is turned into ash. However, Shiva observes Parvati and asks her how he can help her. She enjoins him to resuscitate Madana, and Shiva agrees to let Madana live but in a disembodied form; hence Kamadeva is also called Ananga (an- = without; anga = body, "bodiless"), or Atanu (a- = without; tanu = body). The spirit of love embodied by Kama is now disseminated across the cosmos: afflicting humanity with the creation of a different atmosphere. Lord Shiva agrees with Mother Parvati's proposal and their pooja results the  birth of Lord Karthikeya. Their son Kartikeya goes on to defeat Taraka.

Incarnations

According to Garuda Purana, Pradyumna and Samba - the sons of Krishna, Sanat Kumara - the son of Brahma, Skanda - the son of Shiva, Sudarshana (the presiding deity of Sudarshana Chakra), and Bharata are all incarnations of Kama. The myth of Kamadeva's incineration is referenced in the Matsya Purana and Bhagavata Purana to reveal a relationship between
Krishna and Kamadeva. In the narrative, Kama is reincarnated in the womb of Krishna's wife Rukmini as Pradyumna, after being burned to ashes by Shiva.

Beliefs and worship
The deity of Kamadeva along with his consort Rati is included in the pantheon of Vedic-Brahmanical deities such as Shiva and Parvati. In Hindu traditions for the marriage ceremony itself, the bride's feet are often painted with pictures of Suka, the parrot vahana of Kamadeva.

The religious rituals addressed to him offer a means of purification and re-entry into the community. Devotion to Kamadeva keeps desire within the framework of the religious tradition. Kamadeva appears in many stories and becomes the object of devotional rituals for those seeking health, physical beauty, husbands, wives, and sons. In one story Kamadeva himself succumbs to desire, and must then worship his lover in order to be released from this passion and its curse.

Rituals and festivals

Holi is a Hindu festival, celebrated in the Indian subcontinent. It is sometimes called Madana-Mahotsava or Kama-Mahotsava. This festival is mentioned by Jaimini, in his early writings such as Purvamimamsa-sutra, dated c. 400 BC.

The Ashoka tree is often planted near temples. The tree is said to be a symbol of love and is dedicated to Kamadeva.

In Gaudiya Vaishnavism
In the Gaudiya Vaishnava tradition, Krishna is identified as the original Kamadeva in Vrindavana. Kamadeva also incarnates as Krishna's son Shamba after being burned down by Shiva. Since he was begotten by Krishna himself, his qualities were similar to those of Krishna, such as his colour, appearance, and attributes. This Shamba is not considered identical with Vishnu's vyuha-manifestation called Shamba, but is an individual soul (jiva-tattva) who, owing to his celestial powers, becomes an emanation of Vishnu's prowess.

The Kamadeva that was incinerated is believed to be a celestial demigod capable of inducing love and lusty desires. He is distinguished from the spiritual Kamadeva. Here Krishna is the source of Kamadeva's inciting power, the ever-fresh transcendental god of love of Vrindavana, the origin of all forms of Kamadeva, yet above mundane love, who is worshiped with the Kama-Gayatri and Kama-Bija mantras.

When Kamadeva is referenced as smara in Bhāgavata Purāṇa (book 10) in the context of the supramundane love between Krishna and the gopis (cowherd maidens), he is not the Deva who incites lusty feelings. The word smara rather refers to Krishna himself, who through the medium of his flute increases his influence on the devoted gopis. The symptoms of this smarodayam (lit. "arousal of desire") experienced by the gopis have been described in a commentary (by Vishvanatha Cakravarti) as follows:<ref>Bhagavata Purana 10.21.3 Tika, “caksu-ragah prathamam cittasangas tata ‘tha sankalpah nidra-cchedas tanuta visaya-nivrittis trapanasah / unmado muriccha mrtir ity etah smara-dasa dasaiva syuh.”</ref> "First comes attraction expressed through the eyes, then intense attachment in the mind, then determination, loss of sleep, becoming emaciated, uninterested in external things, shamelessness, madness, becoming stunned, and death. These are the ten stages of Cupid’s effects." The beauty of Krishna's consort, Radha, is without equal in the universe, and her power constantly defeats the god of love, Kamadeva.

Temples
While it is believed that there are no temples to Kamadeva, and no murtis (statues) of Kamadeva are sold for worship on the market, yet there is an ancient temple of Madan Kamdev in Baihata Chariali, Kamrup district in Assam. Madan is the brother of Kamadeva. The ruins of Madan Kamdev are scattered widely in a secluded place, covering 500 meters.

Some other temples dedicated or related to this deva:
Kameshwara Temple, in Aragalur. The Sthala purana indicates that Kamadeva woke up Shiva at this place.
Kameshvara Temple, in Kamyavan, one of the twelve forests of Vrindavana.
 Soundaraja Perumal Temple at Thadikombu, near Dindigul, Tamil Nadu
 Harsat-Mata Temple at Abhaneri has representation of Kamadeva.

In English Literature

Letitia Elizabeth Landon's descriptive poem Manmadin, the Indian Cupid, floating down the Ganges appeared in The Literary Gazette, 1822 (Fragment in Rhyme VII.'')

Notes

References

 

Hindu gods
Love and lust gods